Hilton Root is an American academic. He is a professor of public policy at the Schar School of Policy and Government of George Mason University, in Virginia. He specializes in international political economy and international development.

His published work includes Dynamics among Nations: The Evolution of Legitimacy and Development in Modern States, which was published by the MIT Press in 2013.

Education
Mellon Post-Doctoral Program in Social Sciences, California Institute of Technology
Ph.D., University of Michigan
Diplôme d’Etudes Avancées, Politics & Law, Université de Bourgone, Dijon, France 
M.A., University of Michigan
B.A., State University of New York at Buffalo

References 

Year of birth missing (living people)
Living people
21st-century American economists
George Mason University faculty
University of Michigan alumni